Trokhino is a rural locality (a village) in Kiprevskoye Rural Settlement, Kirzhachsky District, Vladimir Oblast, Russia. The population was 1 as of 2010. There are 2 streets.

Geography 
Trokhino is located 13 km southeast of Kirzhach (the district's administrative centre) by road. Polutino is the nearest rural locality.

References 

Rural localities in Kirzhachsky District